Elections for the twelfth provincial assembly of Sindh were held on 10th October 2002, under the military regime of General Pervez Musharraf, after a martial law of three years.

List of members of the 12th Provincial Assembly of Sindh 
tenure of the twelfth assembly was from 10 October 2002 to 15 November 2007. This is a list of members of the 12th Provincial Assembly of Sindh, Pakistan.

References 

Provincial Assemblies of Pakistan
Provincial Assembly of Sindh